Andabil (also Romanized as Andabīl; also known as Andad) is a village in Khanandabil-e Sharqi Rural District, in the Central District of Khalkhal County, Ardabil Province, Iran. At the 2006 census, its population was 1,400, in 334 families.

Andabil is located on the north-eastern outskirts of Khalkhal, along Route 22.

Geography
The village is located 1.2 miles from Khalkhal, 2.1 miles from Aliabad, 2.2 miles from Bagh, 2.1 miles from Khujin and 1.4 miles from Khaneqah-e Sadat.

Transport
Andabil is located along Route 22. The road connects the village to the Herowabad city centre to the south-west and to the town of Nav in the northeast, eventually joining the north-south direction Route 49 which connects to Azerbaijan.

References

External links

Tageo

Towns and villages in Khalkhal County